The table below lists the judgments of the Constitutional Court of South Africa delivered in 2009.

The members of the court at the start of 2009 were Chief Justice Pius Langa, Deputy Chief Justice Dikgang Moseneke, and judges Edwin Cameron, Yvonne Mokgoro, Sandile Ngcobo, Bess Nkabinde, Kate O'Regan, Albie Sachs, Thembile Skweyiya, Johann van der Westhuizen and Zak Yacoob. Chief Justice Langa and Justices Mokgoro, O'Regan and Sachs retired in October 2009, as they were all founding members of the court whose terms of office expired. They were replaced by the appointment of Johan Froneman, Chris Jafta, Sisi Khampepe and Mogoeng Mogoeng, and Justice Ngcobo was elevated to the post of Chief Justice.

References
 
 

2009
Constitutional Court
Constitutional Court of South Africa